Chaetopreussia is a genus of fungi in the family Sporormiaceae. This is a monotypic genus, containing the single species Chaetopreussia chadefaudii.

References

Pleosporales
Monotypic Dothideomycetes genera